Jonny Malbon is a British professional sailor born on 11 July 1974

His sailing career highlight was competing in the 2008-2009 Vendee Globe aboard Artimist Ocean Racing II the only IMOCA 60 design by Simon Rodger. He had an eventful race which ended in him retired when he got to New Zealand due to severe mainsail damage but before that he also hit a whale.

Before competing in the Vendee Globe he had clocked up more than 300,000 miles on all of the world oceans. He worked alongside Chay Blyth on the BT Global Challenge where he was in charge of crew training. He also gained experience of IMOCA 60's by doing boat preparation for Mike Golding, Dee Caffari, Ellen MacArthur's and Brian Thompson.

He has a degree from Greenwich University.

References

1974 births
Living people
British male sailors (sport)
Alumni of the University of Greenwich
IMOCA 60 class sailors
British Vendee Globe sailors
2008 Vendee Globe sailors